Petrovskaya is a rural locality (a village) in Nizhne-Vazhskoye Rural Settlement, Verkhovazhsky District, Vologda Oblast, Russia. The population was 15 as of 2002.

Geography 
Petrovskaya is located 11 km northeast of Verkhovazhye (the district's administrative centre) by road. Martynovskaya is the nearest rural locality.

References 

Rural localities in Verkhovazhsky District